Eupithecia dimidia is a moth in the family Geometridae. It is found in Armenia.

References

Moths described in 1982
dimidia
Moths of Asia